The 2007 Guangzhou International Women's Open was a tennis tournament played on outdoor hard courts. It was the 4th edition of the Guangzhou International Women's Open, and was a Tier III event on the 2007 Sony Ericsson WTA Tour. It was held in Guangzhou, People's Republic of China, from September 24 through September 30, 2009. Total prize money for the tournament was $175,000.

WTA entrants

Seeds

Singles 

 1 Seeds are based on the rankings of September 17, 2007.

Doubles 

 1 Seeds are based on the rankings of September 17, 2007.

Other entrants 
The following players received wildcards into the singles main draw
  Sun Shengnan
  Yan Zi
  Ji Chunmei

The following players received entry from the singles qualifying draw:
  Elise Tamaëla
  Julie Ditty
  Song Shanshan
  Raquel Kops-Jones

Champions

Singles 

 Virginie Razzano def.  Tzipora Obziler, 6–3, 6–0
Razzano won the first WTA title of her career, while Obziler reached her first WTA final at the age of 34 years.

Doubles 

 Peng Shuai /  Yan Zi def.  Vania King /  Sun Tiantian, 6–3, 6–4

Prize money and points breakdown

Singles

Doubles

References

External links 
Official website
Draws and other information

Guangzhou International Women's Open
2007
Guangzhou International Women's Open, 2007